A Summer Rain is a 1978 Brazilian comedy-drama film directed by Carlos Diegues. It tells the story of Afonso, a newly retired sixty-five-year-old man who falls in love with his neighbor.

Cast
Joffre Soares as Afonso
Miriam Pires as Isaura
Rodolfo Arena as Lourenço
Carlos Gregório as Paulinho
Gracinda Freire as Judith
Cristina Aché as Lurdinha
Luis Antonio as Lacraia
Daniel Filho as Geraldinho
Marieta Severo as Dodora
Lourdes Mayer as Dona Helô
Paulo César Pereio as Juraci
Sady Cabral as Abelardo
Roberto Bonfim as chief officer

Reception
It was awarded the Best Film at the 4th Festival de Cine Iberoamericano de Huelva, and it has won four awards at the 11th Festival de Brasília: Best Editing, Best Scenography, Best Supporting Actress for Pires and Best Supporting Actor for Pereio.

References

External links

1970s romantic comedy-drama films
1978 films
Brazilian romantic comedy-drama films
Films about old age
Films directed by Carlos Diegues
1970s Portuguese-language films